Coptocarpus is a genus of beetles in the family Carabidae, containing the following species:

 Coptocarpus australis (Dejean, 1831) 
 Coptocarpus championensis Chaudoir, 1882 
 Coptocarpus chaudoiri Macleay, 1873 
 Coptocarpus doddi Sloane, 1910 
 Coptocarpus fuscitarsis (Blanchard, 1853) 
 Coptocarpus gibbus Chaudoir, 1882 
 Coptocarpus grossus Erwin, 1974 
 Coptocarpus impar Sloane, 1910 
 Coptocarpus nitidus Macleay, 1873 
 Coptocarpus philipi Erwin, 1974 
 Coptocarpus thoracicus (Castelnau, 1867) 
 Coptocarpus yorkensis Erwin, 1974

References

Licininae